Joshua Thomas "Josh" Edmondson (born 6 July 1992) is a British road racing cyclist, who most recently rode for British amateur team Crimson Orientation Marketing RT. Earlier in his career, Edmondson rode for UCI World Tour squad  in 2013 and 2014.

Career
He earned his Sky contract by impressing in the 2012 Tour of Britain going on the attack in the race's queen stage. He is a climber and was seen as a possible future prospect in Grand Tours. After two seasons with Sky his contract was not renewed at the end of 2014. In March 2015 he announced that we would join  for the remainder of the 2015 season.

Major results

2009
 1st Stage 1 Grand Prix Rüebliland
 3rd Overall Junior Tour of Wales
2010
 1st Overall Isle of Man Youth Tour
1st Stage 2
 3rd Overall Junior Tour of Wales
1st  Mountains classification
 4th Road race, UCI Juniors Road World Championships
2012
 3rd Road race, National Under-23 Road Championships
 10th Overall Giro della Valle d'Aosta
2013
 9th Japan Cup
2014
 5th Road race, National Road Championships
2015
 1st  Overall Ronde de l'Oise
1st Mountains classification
1st Stage 4
 2nd Overall Rás Tailteann
 6th Overall Tour d'Azerbaïdjan
1st Stage 3

References

External links

 
 
 

1992 births
Living people
English male cyclists
Sportspeople from Leeds